Żary railway station is a railway station serving the town of Żary, in the Lubusz Voivodeship, Poland. The station opened in 1846 and is located on the Łódź-Forst railway, Miłkowice–Jasień railway, Żary–Zielona Góra railway and Żary–Legnica railway. The train services are operated by Koleje Dolnośląskie, PKP Intercity and Przewozy Regionalne.

Train services
The station is served by the following services:

Regional services (R) Forst (Lausitz) – Żary – Żagań
Regional services (R) Zielona Góra Główna – Żary – Żagań
Regional services (R) Zielona Góra Główna – Żary – Węgliniec – Zgorzelec – Görlitz
Regional services (Os) Żary – Żagań – Legnica
Regional services (OsP) Forst (Lausitz) – Żary – Żagań – Legnica – Wrocław Główny
Regional services (P) Berlin Lichtenberg – Cottbus – Forst (Lausitz) – Żary – Żagań – Legnica – Wrocław Główny
Express services (TLK) Zielona Góra Główna – Żary – Legnica – Wrocław Główny – Opole Główne – Częstochowa  – Koluszki – Warszawa Wschodnia

Until mid-December 2014 the station was also served by EuroCity "Wawel", which used to run once daily between Berlin Hauptbahnhof and Wrocław Główny.

References

External links
 
Przewozy Regionalne website 

Railway stations in Lubusz Voivodeship
Railway stations in Poland opened in 1846